Centennial is of or relating to a century, a period of 100 years.

Centennial may also refer to:

Entertainment 
 Centennial (novel), a 1974 novel by James Michener
 Centennial (miniseries), a 1978 television miniseries based on the Michener novel
 Centennial (comics), a character featured in Marvel Comics
 Centennial (album), a 1984 instrumental album by John Stewart

Places

Australia 
 Centennial Parklands, three parklands in the eastern suburbs of Sydney

Canada 
 Centennial, Moncton, New Brunswick
 Centennial, Winnipeg, Manitoba
Centennial Lake (Algoma District), Ontario
Centennial Lake (Renfrew County), Ontario

United States 
 Centennial, California, a proposed planned community in Los Angeles County
 Centennial, Colorado, a home rule municipality near Denver
 Centennial, Indiana, an unincorporated community
 Centennial, Michigan, an unincorporated community
 Centennial Heights, Michigan, an unincorporated community
 Centennial, Portland, Oregon, a city neighborhood
 Centennial, West Virginia, an unincorporated community
 Centennial, Wyoming, a census-designated place
 Centennial Mountains, Idaho and Montana
 Centennial District (Philadelphia), a neighborhood
 Centennial Neighborhood District, Lafayette, Indiana
 Lake Centennial (Maryland), a man-made reservoir

Multiple countries 
 Centennial Park (disambiguation)

Businesses 
 Centennial Airlines, an airline based in Wyoming from 1981 to 1987
 Centennial Airlines (Spain)
 Centennial Communications, a US-based telecommunications corporation

Education 
 Centennial Campus of North Carolina State University, a research park and educational campus in Raleigh, North Carolina
 Centennial Biomedical Campus of North Carolina State University
 Centennial College, Scarborough, Ontario, Canada
 Centennial School District (disambiguation), various districts in the United States
 Centennial High School (disambiguation), various schools in the United States and Canada
 Centennial Collegiate, Saskatoon, Saskatchewan, Canada, a high school
 Centennial Secondary School (disambiguation), various schools in Canada

Sports 
 Ayr Centennials, a junior ice hockey team
 Calgary Centennials, a junior ice hockey team
 Merritt Centennials, a junior ice hockey team
 Nashville Centennials, a minor league baseball team
 North Bay Centennials, a junior ice hockey team
 Philadelphia Centennials, a major league baseball team
 Centennial Conference, in the NCAA Division III

Transportation 
 Centennial Parkway, an arterial road in Hamilton, Ontario, Canada
 Centennial GO Station, a station in the GO Transit network located in Markham, Ontario, Canada
 Centennial Class, a class of Union Pacific EMD DDA40X diesel locomotives

Other 
 Centennial Airport, the second-busiest American general aviation airport, located near Denver, Colorado
 Centennial Award, bestowed by Filipino Academy of Movie Arts and Sciences in 1997 only, in honor of the centennial of Philippine independence
 Centennial Baptist Church, Helena, Arkansas, on the National Register of Historic Places
 Centennial comfort stations, restrooms built in 1876 in Philadelphia
 Centennial Exposition, the first world's fair held in America, in Philadelphia in 1876
 Centennial Fountain (disambiguation)
 Centennial Hall (disambiguation)
 Centennial Tower (disambiguation)
 Alfred "Centennial" Johnson (1846–1927), Danish-born American fisherman who made the first recorded single-handed crossing of the Atlantic Ocean in honor of the first centennial of the United States
 Smith & Wesson Centennial, a model group of snub-nosed revolvers
 A Canadian barley cultivar
 An American variety of hops
 An alternative term for Generation Z

See also
 Century (disambiguation)
 Centenary (disambiguation)
 Centenario (disambiguation)
 Centennial Discovery